The Amateur Gourmet, or Adam Roberts, is an American food and humor writer who resides in Los Angeles, California.

Roberts, born in 1979, started his food blog while a frustrated law student in Atlanta in 2004. Roberts moved to New York in 2005, and published a book based on his blog in 2007.

The blog depends largely on Roberts' own public persona—the Boston Globe describes him as "skinny and nebbishy, with a nasally musical theater voice that would fit perfectly on NPR's This American Life"—and combines irreverent accounts of Roberts' own cooking attempts with foodie essays and restaurant reviews.  There are also short videos intended to be humorous, such as "Great Moments in Musical Theater Featuring Eggs." Roberts' roommates, friends, and romantic interests were regular characters from early on, but his eccentric family has been featured most prominently, including his celebrity-photographing parents from Boca Raton, Florida.

Roberts has also been the Food Network's official blogger for the competitive cooking program The Next Iron Chef, and in 2008 became the host of their weekly web show, the FN Dish.

In 2010, Roberts sold his first cookbook to Artisan, the publisher of such notable cookbooks as the James Beard Award-winning Ad Hoc at Home and A Platter of Figs. Roberts's book, Secrets of the Best Chefs, was published in October 2012.

Openly gay, he is the husband of screenwriter and film director Craig Johnson.

In 2015, Roberts began work as a television writer on the ABC sitcom, "The Real O'Neals," starring Martha Plimpton and Jay R. Ferguson.

In 2020, Roberts began writing a biweekly newsletter on Substack which currently has over 11,000 subscribers. His latest book, Give My Swiss Chards to Broadway: The Official Broadway Lover's Cookbook (co-written with Tony nominee Gideon Glick), arrives on shelves October 2022.

References

External links
 amateurgourmet.com
 Amazon page for Amateur Gourmet: How to Chop, Shop and Table Hop Like a Pro (Almost)
  Boston Globe coverage of his book
  The Next Iron Chef blog

1979 births
American male bloggers
American bloggers
American Internet celebrities
Emory University alumni
Living people
Writers from Los Angeles
American gay writers
21st-century pseudonymous writers
21st-century American LGBT people